Zhuzhou Times New Material Technology Co., Ltd. known also as TMT, is a Chinese plastic manufacturer based in Zhuzhou, Hunan Province. The company also produced mica.

History
The predecessor of TMT was found as a research division of Zhuzhou Electric Locomotive Research Institute (now , formerly CSR Zhuzhou Electric Locomotive Research Institute Co., Ltd.) in 1984. It followed the direct parent company to become part of CSR Group in 2002 (spin off from the Ministry of Railways' LORIC). On 19 December 2002 the company became a listed company.

In 2007 CSR Group spin off CSR Corporation Limited as the new holding company for CSR Zhuzhou Electric Locomotive Research Institute, as well as also listed in the stock exchange. In 2015, TMT became an indirect subsidiary of CRRC Group and its listed flagship CRRC.

Shareholders
As of 4 January 2017, Zhuzhou Times New Material Technology was absolutely controlled (>50%) by the state-owned CRRC Group via its flagship company CRRC and other unlisted subsidiaries. Moreover, other subsidiaries of the State Council: Central Huijin Investment and National Council for Social Security Fund (as investment manager for the Social Security Fund), also owned minority stakes in TMT. In the top 10 (direct) shareholders, only two were not related to the state, as private equity funds of the Bank of China and the Agricultural Bank of China (1.08% shares and 0.78% shares respectively).

On 26 December 2016 – 3 January 2017, CRRC's non wholly owned subsidiary CRRC Qingdao Sifang, also sold 1.29% shares of the listed company to the general public for about  each.

Footnotes

References

External links
 

CRRC Group
Companies listed on the Shanghai Stock Exchange
Zhuzhou